Jens Nordström (born 12 September 1976) is a Swedish footballer who plays as a defender.

References

Association football defenders
Swedish footballers
Allsvenskan players
Superettan players
Malmö FF players
Landskrona BoIS players
Living people
1976 births
FC Rosengård 1917 players